Untouchable or The Untouchable may refer to:

People
 Untouchability, the practice of socially ostracizing a minority group of very low social status
 A word for the Dalits or Scheduled Caste of India, a group that experiences untouchability
 Nicolino Locche (1939–2005), Argentine boxer and light welterweight world champion nicknamed "The Untouchable"

Films
 The Untouchables, a 1987 American crime film 
 Untouchable, UK title of the French feature film The Intouchables (2011), written and directed by Olivier Nakache and Éric Toledano, and starring François Cluzet and Omar Sy
 Untouchable (2019 film), a documentary about the film producer Harvey Weinstein

Books
 Untouchable (novel), a 1935 novel by Mulk Raj Anand
 The Untouchable (novel), a 1997 roman à clef by John Banville

Music
 Untouchable (band), a South Korean hip-hop duo

Albums
 Untouchable (Before Their Eyes album), 2010
 Untouchable (Anathema album), 2013
 Untouchable (Mac Mall album), 1996
 The Untouchable, by Scarface

Songs
 "Untouchable" (Girls Aloud song), 2008
 "Untouchable" (Tupac Shakur song), 2006
 "Untouchable", by Above the Law from Livin' Like Hustlers
 "Untouchable" (Eminem song), by Eminem from Revival
 "Untouchable" (Johnny Ruffo song), 2013
 "Untouchable", by Atreyu from Baptize
 "Untouchable", by Big Time Rush from 24/Seven
 "Untouchable", by Garbage from Beautiful Garbage
 "Untouchable", by Luna Halo from Luna Halo
 "Untouchable", by Motionless in White from Graveyard Shift
 "Untouchable", by Taylor Swift from Fearless
 "Untouchable", a two-part song by Anathema from Weather Systems
 "Untouchable", by Ilse Delange from Next To Me

Television
 Untouchable (Japanese TV series), a 2009 Japanese series
 Untouchable (South Korean TV series), a 2017 South Korean series
 "Untouchable" (The Flash), an episode of The Flash

Other
 Untouchable, a Japanese manzai comedy duo and winners of the 2004 M-1 Grand Prix
 unTouchable, a webtoon by massstar
 DGUSA Untouchable, a wrestling pay-per-view event

See also
 Untouchables (disambiguation)
 Nicky Barnes (1933–2012), American former gang leader turned informant nicknamed "Mr. Untouchable"
 Intouchable, French hip hop / rap band